The 2005 Pan American Aerobic Gymnastics Championships were held in Mexico City, Mexico. The competition was organized by the Mexican Gymnastics Federation.

Medalists

References

2005 in gymnastics
International gymnastics competitions hosted by Mexico
2005 in Mexican sports
Pan American Gymnastics Championships